Hundred Year Hall is a two-CD live album by the Grateful Dead. It was the first album to be released after Jerry Garcia's death, and one of the first releases in a continuing rush of live albums from the band's vault. It contains about two thirds of the April 26 concert at the Jahrhunderthalle in Frankfurt, West Germany, during the Dead's Spring 1972 tour of Europe (a tour originally represented by the Europe '72 album, released in 1972; though that release contained no tracks from the Frankfurt date).  Disc one includes a number of songs from the first set, followed by the last part of the second set.  Disc two includes the first part of the second set.

Hundred Year Hall was certified Gold by the RIAA on January 8, 1997.

The concert in its entirety was later released as part of Europe '72: The Complete Recordings (with the previously released tracks receiving a slightly different mix).

"Hundred Year Hall" is a literal translation of "Jahrhunderthalle"; "Centennial Hall" is the usual translation.

Set list
Following is the full set list from the April 26, 1972, concert in Frankfurt.

First set: "Bertha"*, "Me and My Uncle"*, "Mr. Charlie", "He's Gone", "Black-Throated Wind", "Next Time You See Me"*, "China Cat Sunflower"* → "I Know Your Rider"*, "Jack Straw"*, "Big Railroad Blues"*, "Playing in the Band"*, "Chinatown Shuffle", "Loser", "Beat It On Down the Line", "You Win Again", "Good Lovin'", "Dire Wolf", "Casey Jones"
Second set: "Truckin'"* → "The Other One"* → "Comes a Time"* → "Sugar Magnolia"*, "El Paso", "Tennessee Jed", "Greatest Story Ever Told", "The Stranger (Two Souls in Communion)"**, "Turn On Your Love Light"* → "Goin' Down the Road Feeling Bad"* → "One More Saturday Night"*
Notes

*appears on Hundred Year Hall

** later released as bonus track on Europe '72

Track listing

Disc one
"Bertha" (Jerry Garcia, Robert Hunter) – 5:41
"Me and My Uncle" (John Phillips) – 3:05
"Next Time You See Me" (Earl Forest, William Harvey) – 4:15
"China Cat Sunflower" (Garcia, Hunter) – 5:14 →
"I Know You Rider" (traditional, arranged by Grateful Dead) – 5:14
"Jack Straw" (Bob Weir, Hunter) – 4:47
"Big Railroad Blues" (Noah Lewis) – 3:54
"Playing in the Band" (Weir, Mickey Hart, Hunter) – 9:17
"Turn On Your Love Light" (Deadric Malone, Joseph Scott) – 19:13 →
"Goin' Down the Road Feeling Bad" (traditional, arranged by Grateful Dead) – 7:32 →
"One More Saturday Night" (Weir) – 4:44

Disc two
"Truckin'" (Garcia, Weir, Phil Lesh, Hunter) – 17:45 →
"The Other One" (Weir, Kreutzmann) – 36:29 →
"Comes a Time" (Garcia, Hunter) – 6:45 →
"Sugar Magnolia" (Weir, Hunter) – 7:23

Note: The track "The Other One" is incorrectly called "Cryptical Envelopment" on the release.

Personnel
Jerry Garcia – lead guitar, vocals
Bob Weir – rhythm guitar, vocals
Phil Lesh – bass guitar, vocals
Ron "Pigpen" McKernan – harmonica, vocals, organ
Keith Godchaux – piano
Donna Godchaux – vocals
Bill Kreutzmann – drums

Production
John Cutler – producer
Phil Lesh – producer
Jeffrey Norman – mastering
Dick Latvala – tape archivist
Gecko Graphics – artwork and design
Robert Hunter – CD liner notes

Charts
Album – Billboard

References 

Grateful Dead live albums
1995 live albums
Albums produced by Phil Lesh
Grateful Dead Records live albums